They Have Changed Their Face is a 1971 Italian horror film directed by Corrado Farina and starring Adolfo Celi. The film won the Golden Leopard award for the Best First Feature at the Locarno International Film Festival in 1971.

Plot
The director of a known car corporation invites one of his employees to his country villa to give him the good news. He just got promoted. However, the old man is not what he seems and promotion has a price.

Production
The screenplay of They Have Changed Their Face was written by Giulio Berruta and director Corrado Farina. They were influenced by German philosopher Herbert Marcuse, specifically his book One-Dimensional Man(1964), a critique of capitalism and communist Russia which provided the film with its thesis that consumerism is a form of social control. According to Farina, the film was very low budget, costing about 50 million Italian lire.

The film was shot in Turin and Incir-DePaolis Studios in Rome between December 1970 and January 1971.

Release
They Have Changed Their Face was distributed by Garligiano in Italy on 2 July 1971. The film grossed a total of 28.01 million Italian lire on its domestic release. The film was released on DVD in the United States in 2014 as They've Changed Their Faces.

Reception
They Have Changed Their Face won the Golden Leopard award for the Best First Feature at the Locarno International Film Festival in 1971.

In his overview of Italian gothic films of the 1970s, film critic and historian Roberto Curti described the film "stagnates and sags halfway through" and that some of the social and political commentary in the film became a bit "naive and predictable" Farina spoke about the film later, declaring that "had it been made with a bigger budget and means, it might have been a cute little thing ... it is sad to see it today, as it is basically a conceptual movie."

References

Footnotes

Sources

External links

1971 films
1971 horror films
Gothic horror films
Italian horror films
1970s Italian-language films
Golden Leopard winners
Films directed by Corrado Farina
Films set in country houses
Films shot in Italy
Films shot in Rome
1970s Italian films